Route 236 is a collector road in the Canadian province of Nova Scotia.

It is located in Hants County and Colchester County, connecting Brooklyn at Route 215 with Truro at Highway 102/Trunk 2.

Communities

Brooklyn
Union Corner
Scotch Village
Mosherville
Stanley
Clarksville
Kennetcook
South Maitland
Green Oaks
Beaver Brook
Old Barns
Lower Truro
Truro

See also
List of Nova Scotia provincial highways

References

Roads in Colchester County
Roads in Hants County, Nova Scotia
Nova Scotia provincial highways